The following table is a list of Canadian municipalities with a peak population of 5,000 or more which have experienced a population decline of 5% or more.  The three columns to the left of "Notes" will only be filled in if the 2011 population is not the lowest since the peak population.

See also
List of ghost towns in Canada
Shrinking cities

References

Urban decay in Canada
Population decreases